William John Borlase (9 January 1921 – 26 March 2016) was an Australian rules footballer who played with Footscray in the Victorian Football League (VFL).

Personal life
Borlase served as a corporal in the Australian Army during the Second World War.

Notes

External links 

1921 births
Australian rules footballers from Victoria (Australia)
Western Bulldogs players
2016 deaths
Australian Army personnel of World War II
Australian Army soldiers